Mikhail Andreyevich Ageyev (born 22 April 2000) is a Russian football player who plays as a centre-forward for FC Ural Yekaterinburg.

Club career
He was first called up to the senior squad of FC Lokomotiv Moscow in June 2020. He made his Russian Premier League debut for Lokomotiv on 11 August 2020 in a game against FC Rubin Kazan, he substituted Fyodor Smolov in added time.

On 15 June 2021, he signed with FC Ural Yekaterinburg.

On 14 June 2022, Ageyev joined FC Volgar Astrakhan on loan.

Honours

Club
Lokomotiv Moscow
Russian Cup: 2020–21

Career statistics

References

External links
 
 
 

2000 births
People from Volzhsky, Volgograd Oblast
Sportspeople from Volgograd Oblast
Living people
Russian footballers
Russia youth international footballers
Association football forwards
FC Dynamo Moscow reserves players
FC Lokomotiv Moscow players
FC Ural Yekaterinburg players
FC Volgar Astrakhan players
Russian Premier League players
Russian First League players
Russian Second League players